The 2004 Oregon Ducks football team represented the University of Oregon during the 2004 NCAA Division I-A football season.

Before the season

Recruiting

Schedule

Personnel

Game summaries

Indiana

Source: ESPN

Oklahoma

Source: ESPN

Idaho

Source:

Arizona State

Washington State

Source:

Arizona

Source: ESPN

Stanford

Washington

California

UCLA

Oregon State

References

Oregon
Oregon Ducks football seasons
Oregon Ducks football